Alexandre Marcel (11 September 1860 - 30 June 1928) was a French architect, best known for his Belle Époque interpretations of "exotic" international architectural styles.

Marcel studied at the Parisian École des Beaux-Arts in the atelier of Louis-Jules André.

Works
His work includes:

 the Pagoda Cinema, on the Rue de Babylon, Paris, 1896
 multiple buildings for the Paris Exposition of 1900, including the Cambodian pavilion and the Panorama du Tour du Monde of the sea-transport company Compagnie des messageries maritimes with its "Japanese Tower"
 structures at the Parc Oriental de Maulévrier, Paris, 1899-1913
 reconstruction of the Japanese Tower at Laeken, outside Brussels, for King Leopold II, c. 1901
 the new Chinese Pavilion at Laeken, for Leopold II, c. 1902
 royal racetrack at Ostend, for Leopold II
 grand hall of the Heliopolis Palace Hotel, Heliopolis, Cairo, 1910
 Baron Empain Palace (Qasr Al Baron), Heliopolis, Cairo, completed 1911
 Latin Catholic Basilica "Basilique de Notre-Dame",  Heliopolis, Cairo, 1910
 Palace for the Jagatjit Singh of Kapurthala, now Punjab, India, 1911
 French Embassy, Shiba Park, Tokyo, 1913
 Lafayette Escadrille Memorial, Villeneuve-l'Étang Imperial Estate, in Marnes-la-Coquette, Hauts-de-Seine, outside of Paris, 1928

Sources 
 Online biography

References 

1860 births
1928 deaths
Architects from Paris
19th-century French architects
20th-century French architects
Members of the Académie des beaux-arts
École des Beaux-Arts alumni
Officiers of the Légion d'honneur
Belle Époque